Nayala may refer to:

 Nayala Province, a province in Boucle du Mouhoun Region, Burkina Faso
 Nayala, a village in Jamwa Ramgarh, Jaipur district, Rajasthan, India
 Nayala Fort and Nayala Palace, state-protected monuments in Rajasthan, India
 Nayala Paradi, a village in Daman Tehsil, Daman district, Daman and Diu, India

See also
 Nyala (disambiguation)